Yards Creek Generating Station is a pumped-storage hydroelectric plant in Blairstown and Hardwick Township in Warren County, New Jersey, United States.
The facility is owned by LS Power Group, which purchased it from Public Service Enterprise Group and FirstEnergy in 2020 and 2021. It has an installed capacity of 420 MW.

Location
The facility is located in the Delaware Water Gap region of the New Jersey Skylands.
When built, the complex stretched into the former Pahaquarry Township.  Pahaquarry got its name from the word Pahaquarra, which was a derivation of the Native American word Pahaqualong, which meant "the place between the mountains beside the waters". The township dissolved in 1997, becoming part of Hardwick Township

Operations
Commercial operation began in 1965 and the power station was upgraded in the 1990s. Yards Creek consists of two reservoirs created by earth-fill embankment dams. The full upper reservoir will
last 5.7 hours at Hydraulic Turbine nameplate capacity. The storage facility provides energy regulation and spinning reserve during on-peak hours, and it provides an energy sink off-peak (from 11 P.M. to 7 A.M.) to allow fossil and nuclear plants to remain more fully loaded.

See also

List of power stations in New Jersey
Great Falls (Passaic River)

References 

Blairstown, New Jersey
Hardwick Township, New Jersey
Buildings and structures in Warren County, New Jersey
Hydroelectric power plants in New Jersey
Pumped-storage hydroelectric power stations in the United States
Energy infrastructure completed in 1965
1965 establishments in New Jersey
Dams in New Jersey
Earth-filled dams
Dams completed in 1965
Public Service Enterprise Group